The A 18 road is an A-Grade trunk road in Sri Lanka. It connects Nonagama with Pelmadulla.

The A 18 passes through Siyambalagoda, Padalangala, Thunkama, Embilipitiya, Timbolketiya, Sankhapala, Pallebedda, Godakawela, Madampe and Kahawatta to reach Pelmadulla.

References

Highways in Sri Lanka